Lambie is a surname.  Articles include:

 Ashton Lambie (born 1990), American cyclist
 Alex Lambie (1897–1963), Scottish footballer
 David Lambie (1925–2019), Scottish Labour Party politician
 Derek Lambie (born 1975), Scottish newspaper editor
 Duncan Lambie (born 1952), Scottish footballer
 George Lambie (1882–1965), American soccer football referee
 Jacqui Lambie (born 1971), Australian politician
 Jim Lambie (born 1964), Scottish installation artist
 John Lambie (engineer) (1833–1895), Scottish locomotive engineer
 John Lambie (footballer, born 1868), (1868–1923) Scottish footballer
 John Lambie (footballer, born 1940), Scottish football player and manager
 Patrick Lambie (born 1990), South African rugby union player
 Dr. Thomas Lambie (1885–1854), American medical missionary in Ethiopia
 William Lambie (footballer) (1873–?), Scottish footballer
 W. J. Lambie (William James Lambie, 1860–1900), Australian journalist killed in Boer War
 William Thomas Lambie (1837–1900), American civil engineer

See also
 Lambie-Nairn
 Lambe